Geranium dissectum or Cut-leaved Crane's-bill is a plant species of the genus Geranium. It is native to Europe.

It can be found on other continents as well, in some instances as an introduced species. It can be found in North America, where it is known as the cutleaf geranium.

Extracts of Geranium dissectum are reported to improve germination rates of Hemp seeds.

References

External links

Jepson Manual Treatment - Geranium dissectum
Geranium dissectum - U.C. Photo gallery

dissectum
Flora of Europe
Flora of the United Kingdom
Flora of Palestine (region)